Fear: 13 Stories of Suspense and Horror is a 2010 horror anthology edited by R. L. Stine. Thirteen different authors contributed stories to the anthology, including Meg Cabot, Heather Graham, F. Paul Wilson, and Stine himself. Stine began writing the anthology after the International Thriller Writers asked him to write a book with several stories. Critical reception for the short story collection was positive, with one reviewer stating the stories were highly suspenseful, inventive, easy to understand, and fast-paced.

Plot
The beginning of the book starts with an introduction from R. L. Stine. At the end of the book, there is an "About the Authors" section that includes a brief description of the contributors to the anthology along with some of their works.

Background
R. L. Stine started writing the book after he was asked by the professional association International Thriller Writers (ITW) to write a book with several stories.
The book was published on September 1, 2010, and is available in three formats: paperback, hardcover, and turtleback. Half the proceeds from book sales go to ITW, whereas the other half goes to Reading is Fundamental (RIF), a non-profit literacy organization. In 2010, RIF hosted a party celebrating the release of the book in New York City.

Jennifer Allison's story, "The Perfects", was partly inspired by an old Victorian house she passed each morning on her way to school. "Ray Gun" was Tim Maleeny's first story for young adults.

Reception
Critical reception for the book was positive. An unknown contributor from Kirkus Reviews felt that the stories in the anthology were highly suspenseful, inventive, easy to understand, and fast-paced. Benjamin Boche from TeenReads.com stated that "some of the tales aren’t for the faint of heart, some deal with the intricacies of what science can do, and some are just plain creepy." School Library Journal'''s Joy Fleishhacker said the book incorporated "a pleasing mix of genres, hair-raising events, and deftly drawn protagonists," and that "each tale is fresh and unique while still falling within the compilation's creep-me-out confines." She also felt that the stories in the anthology were surprising and enticing.

Daniel Kraus from Booklist stated that this anthology contained "uninspired entries" although it "keeps the reading level consistent, which makes it a good entry point for reluctant readers moving on from Stine’s own oeuvre". He thought the best story was "Tuition" by Walter Sorrells, but also felt Suzanne Weyn's "Suckers" and "Piney Power" by F. Paul Wilson were worthy of notice. Dawn Crowne from RT Book Reviews'' recommended the stories to those who like reading about urban legends.

References

Bibliography

Young adult anthologies
Works by R. L. Stine
Horror anthologies
2010 anthologies
Dutton Children's Books books
Children's short story collections
2010 children's books